Jarawa language may refer to:
 Jarawa language (Andaman Islands)
 Jarawa language (Nigeria)